Marjan Marković (born 28 September 1981) is a Serbian former professional footballer.

Club career
Born in Požarevac, Marković took his first football steps with his hometown club Mladi Radnik. He was later promoted to the first team and played regularly for the side in the Second League of FR Yugoslavia, attracting the attention of top First League clubs. Although a childhood Partizan supporter, Marković decided to accept the offer from Red Star Belgrade in January 2000, signing a five-year contract. He spent the next six seasons with the Crveno-beli and won six trophies (three league titles and three national cups).

In August 2005, Marković signed with Ukrainian club Dynamo Kyiv. He helped them win the double in the 2006–07 season. In June 2008, Marković terminated his contract with the club in order for him to return to Red Star Belgrade. He was released from his contract in January 2009.

In August 2009, Marković was acquired by Croatian club Istra 1961. He spent the next year and a half with the Zeleno-žuti. In January 2011, Marković signed with Austrian side First Vienna until the end of the season (with an option for another year). He left the club by mutual consent in May 2012. Until the end of the year, Marković played for Kazakhstan Premier League side Kaisar. He also spent some time with Alki Larnaca in Cyprus and Asswehly in Libya, before returning to Serbia and joining Sloga Petrovac in February 2014.

In the summer of 2017, Marković returned to his parent club Mladi Radnik.

International career
Marković was capped 16 times for Serbia (and its predecessors) between 2002 and 2008.

Honours
Red Star Belgrade
 First League of Serbia and Montenegro: 1999–2000, 2000–01, 2003–04
 Serbia and Montenegro Cup: 1999–2000, 2001–02, 2003–04
Dynamo Kyiv
 Ukrainian Premier League: 2006–07
 Ukrainian Cup: 2005–06, 2006–07
 Ukrainian Super Cup: 2006, 2007

Notes

References

External links
 Srbijafudbal profile
 
 
 
 
 

Alki Larnaca FC players
Association football defenders
Association football midfielders
2. Liga (Austria) players
Croatian Football League players
Cypriot First Division players
Expatriate footballers in Austria
Expatriate footballers in Croatia
Expatriate footballers in Cyprus
Expatriate footballers in Greece
Expatriate footballers in Kazakhstan
Expatriate footballers in Libya
Expatriate footballers in Ukraine
FC Dynamo Kyiv players
FC Kaisar players
First League of Serbia and Montenegro players
First Vienna FC players
FK Mladi Radnik players
FK Sloga Petrovac na Mlavi players
Football League (Greece) players
Kazakhstan Premier League players
NK Istra 1961 players
Pierikos F.C. players
Red Star Belgrade footballers
Serbia and Montenegro expatriate footballers
Serbia and Montenegro expatriate sportspeople in Ukraine
Serbia and Montenegro footballers
Serbia and Montenegro international footballers
Serbia and Montenegro under-21 international footballers
Serbia international footballers
Serbian expatriate footballers
Serbian expatriate sportspeople in Austria
Serbian expatriate sportspeople in Croatia
Serbian expatriate sportspeople in Cyprus
Serbian expatriate sportspeople in Greece
Serbian expatriate sportspeople in Kazakhstan
Serbian expatriate sportspeople in Libya
Serbian expatriate sportspeople in Ukraine
Serbian First League players
Serbian footballers
Serbian SuperLiga players
Sportspeople from Požarevac
Ukrainian Premier League players
1981 births
Living people